van Heeswijk is a Dutch surname. Notable people with the surname include:

Jeanne van Heeswijk (born 1965), Dutch visual artist and curator
Max van Heeswijk (born 1973), Dutch cyclist

Dutch-language surnames
Surnames of Dutch origin